Panaque suttonorum, commonly known as the blue-eye panaque, is a species of freshwater fish from the South American catfish family Loricariidae. It is known from the Maracaibo Basin in Venezuela. In the wild, the species feeds on algae and reaches 28 cm (11 inches) SL, although it may grow larger in captivity.

In 2010, P. suttonorum was reevaluated and considered to be a sister species of Panaque cochliodon, due to the similarities between the two.

References

Loricariidae
Fish of South America
Fish described in 1944